The Ford Escort is a small family car that was manufactured by Ford of Europe from 1968 until 2000.  In total there were six generations, spread across three basic platforms beginning with the original rear-wheel drive Mk.1/Mk.2 (1968–1980), the "Erika" front wheel drive Mk.3/Mk.4 (1980–1990), and the final CE-14 Mk.5/Mk.6 (1990–2002) version.  Its successor - the Ford Focus -  was released in 1998, but the final generation of Escort was gradually phased out, with the panel van version ending production in 2002 in favour of the Ford Transit Connect.

The Escort was frequently the best selling car in Britain during the 1980s and 1990s. A total of more than 4.1 million Escorts of all generations were sold there over a period of 33 years.

In 2014, Ford revived the Escort name for a car based on the second-generation Ford Focus sold on the Chinese market.

Naming Convention
Whilst the Escort designation existed three basic platforms (and officially, the canon does not include the British 100E Squire estate, which carried the Escort name), the various rebodies, facelifts and upgrades over the years have been referred to using a conflicting range of "Mark" numbers, with some sources counting a facelift as a new "Mark", some not.  Ford's official convention is that there are just four Escort generations - with the Mk1 and Mk2 being treated as separate generations despite the Mk2 being a "reskinned" version of the Mk1 and is otherwise mechanically identical to its predecessor.  Conversely, Ford recognizes the Mk3 and Mk4 as a single generation - although they are known internally as "Erika" and "Erika-86", respectively.  The post-1990 CE-14 generation, although popularly split into three different models (Mk5, Mk5b and Mk6), are treated as two models - the original 1990 car and the post-1995 facelift (Mk6) version.

This article attempts to fully explain the various naming conventions used by each historical iteration of the vehicle.

Ford Escort 100E (1955–1961)

The first use of the Ford Escort name was for a reduced specification version of the Ford Squire, a 1950s estate car version of the British Ford Anglia 100E.

First generation (1967–1975)

The Mark I Ford Escort was introduced in Ireland and the United Kingdom at the end of 1967, making its show debut at the Brussels Motor Show in January 1968. It replaced the successful, long-running Anglia. The Escort was also presented in Europe as the first passenger car to be developed by the merged Ford of Europe (the Transit van having been the first product of this collaboration).  Escort production commenced at the Halewood plant in England during the closing months of 1967, and for left hand drive markets during September 1968 at the Ford plant in Genk. Initially the continental Escorts differed slightly under the skin from the UK built ones. The front suspension and steering gear were configured differently and the brakes were fitted with dual hydraulic circuits; also the wheels fitted on the Genk-built Escorts had wider rims. At the beginning of 1970, continental European production transferred to a new plant on the edge of Saarlouis, West Germany.

The Escort was a commercial success in several parts of Western Europe, but nowhere more so than in the UK, where the national bestseller of the 1960s, BMC's Austin/Morris 1100 was beginning to show its age, while Ford's own Cortina had grown, both in dimensions and in price, beyond the market niche at which it had originally been pitched. It competed with the Vauxhall Viva, and from early 1970 the Rootes Group's Hillman Avenger.

In June 1974, six years into the car's UK introduction, Ford announced the completion of the two millionth Ford Escort, a milestone hitherto unmatched by any Ford model outside the US. It was also stated that 60% of the two million Escorts had been built in Britain. In West Germany, cars were built at a slower rate of around 150,000 cars per year, slumping to 78,604 in 1974 which was the last year for the Escort Mk1. Many of the German built Escorts were exported, notably to Benelux and Italy; from the West German domestic market perspective the car was cramped and uncomfortable when compared with the well-established and comparably priced Opel Kadett, and it was technically primitive when set against the successful imported Fiat 128 and Renault 12. Subsequent generations of the Escort made up some of the ground foregone by the original model, but in Europe's largest auto-market the Escort sales volumes always came in well behind those of the General Motors Kadett and its Astra successor.

 The Escort had conventional rear-wheel drive and a four-speed manual gearbox, or three-speed automatic transmission. The suspension consisted of MacPherson strut front suspension and a simple live axle mounted on leaf springs. The Escort was the first small Ford to use rack-and-pinion steering. The Mark I featured contemporary styling cues in tune with its time: a subtle Detroit-inspired "Coke bottle" waistline and the "dogbone" shaped front grille – arguably the car's main stylistic feature. Similar Coke bottle styling featured in the larger Cortina Mark III (a visually similar car was built in West Germany as the Taunus) launched in 1970.

Initially, the Escort was sold as a two-door saloon (with circular front headlights and rubber flooring on the "De Luxe" model). The "Super" model featured rectangular headlights, carpets, a cigar lighter and a water temperature gauge. A two-door estate was introduced at the end of March 1968 which, with the back seat folded down, provided a 40% increase in maximum load space over the old Anglia 105E estate, according to the manufacturer. The estate featured the same engine options as the saloon, but it also included a larger,  clutch, stiffer rear springs and in most configurations, slightly larger brake drums or discs than the saloon. A panel van appeared in April 1968 and the 4-door saloon (a bodystyle the Anglia was never available in for UK market) in 1969.

Underneath the bonnet was the Kent Crossflow engine also used in the smallest capacity North American Ford Pinto. Diesel engines on small family cars were rare, and the Escort was no exception, initially featuring only petrol engines – in 1.1 L, and 1.3 L versions. A 940 cc engine was also available in some export markets such as Italy and France. This tiny engine remained popular in Italy, where it was carried over for the Escort Mark II, but in France it was discontinued during 1972.

There was a 1300GT performance version, with a tuned 1.3 L Crossflow (OHV) engine with a Weber carburetor and uprated suspension. This version featured additional instrumentation with a tachometer, battery charge indicator, and oil pressure gauge. The same tuned 1.3 L engine was also used in a variation sold as the Escort Sport, that used the flared front wings from the AVO range of cars, but featured trim from the more basic models. Later, an "executive" version of the Escort was produced known as the "1300E". This featured the same 13" road wheels and flared wings of the Sport, but was trimmed in an upmarket, for that time, fashion with wood trim on the dashboard and door cappings.

A higher performance version for rallies and racing was available, the Escort Twin Cam, built for Group 2 international rallying. It had an engine with a Lotus-made eight-valve twin camshaft head fitted to the 1.5 L non-crossflow block, which had a bigger bore than usual to give a capacity of 1,558 cc. This engine had originally been developed for the Lotus Elan. Production of the Twin Cam, which was originally produced at Halewood, was phased out as the Cosworth-engined RS1600 (RS denoting Rallye Sport) production began. The most famous edition of the Twin Cam was raced on behalf of Ford by Alan Mann Racing in the British Saloon Car Championship in 1968 and 1969, sporting a full Formula 2 Ford FVC 16-valve engine producing over 200 hp. The Escort, driven by Australian driver Frank Gardner went on to comfortably win the 1968 championship.

The Mark I Escorts became successful as a rally car, and they eventually went on to become one of the most successful rally cars of all time. The Ford works team was practically unbeatable in the late 1960s / early 1970s, and arguably the Escort's greatest victory was in the 1970 London to Mexico World Cup Rally, driven by Finnish legend Hannu Mikkola and Swedish co-driver Gunnar Palm. This gave rise to the Escort Mexico (1598cc "crossflow"-engined) special edition road versions in honour of the rally car. Introduced in November 1970, 10,352 Mexico Mark Is were built using bodyshells using additional strengthening panels in high stress areas making them more suitable for competition.

In addition to the Mexico, the RS1600 was developed with a 1,601 cc Cosworth BDA which used a Crossflow block with a 16-valve Cosworth cylinder head, named for "Belt Drive A Series". Both the Mexico and RS1600 were built at Ford's Advanced Vehicle Operations (AVO) facility located at the Aveley Plant in South Essex. As well as higher performance engines and sports suspension, like the Mexico these models featured the strengthened bodyshell.

Ford also produced an RS2000 model as an alternative to the somewhat temperamental RS1600, featuring a 2.0 L Pinto (OHC) engine. This also clocked up some rally and racing victories; and pre-empted the hot hatch market as a desirable but affordable performance road car. Like the Mexico and RS1600, this car was produced at the Aveley plant using the strengthened bodyshell.

The Escort was built in Germany and Britain, as well as in Australia and New Zealand.

Model range

All models 1100 and 1300 were offered in 2 door Saloon, 4 door Saloon and 3 doors Estate versions.

New Zealand

Ford New Zealand's Seaview plant in Lower Hutt built 1.1 and 1.3-litre versions, initially as Deluxe (1.1) and Super (1.3) two-door sedans plus panel vans. The four-door sedan was added in 1970. Trim levels were revised after the 1972 UK facelift with just one run of 1.3XLs (with the GT instrument pack) before these were downgraded to 'L' trim. Base and L trims were offered to the end of the Mk I run. Some 1.6 Mexicos were imported in 1973–74 after the government temporarily freed up import licensing owing to a shortage of new cars. Estate versions were mostly imported.

Australia
The Mk I was produced by Ford Australia from 1970 to 1975 as a two- or four-door saloon and as a two-door panel van. 1100 cc and 1300 cc engines were offered, as was the 1558 cc twin cam unit., the last only in the Escort Twin Cam model, which was renamed the Escort GT 1600 in late 1971. Some 67,146 examples of the Mk I were built in Australia, with local sourcing bringing the Australian content of the vehicles to 85 per cent. In 1975 Ford Australia imported 25 MK1 RS2000 Escorts from England for sale in the local market.

Israel
Assembly of the Mk I Escort was undertaken by Automotive Industries in Upper Nazareth, in conjunction with the local distributor, Israeli Automotive Corp. Assembly from UK-sourced kits started in April 1968. The last Mk I, a light green 1100cc two-door, was produced on 14 November 1975. A total of 14,905 units were assembled in Israel, including 105 Escort 400 vans.

Japan
The Mk I Escort was sold in Japan, imported from the United Kingdom by Kintetsu Motors and was available with the 1.3 L engine in GT trim, and was sold alongside the Ford Cortina and the Ford Capri. Sales were helped by the fact that this generation Escort complied with Japanese government dimension regulations concerning vehicle dimensions and engine displacement. Only the four-door saloon was offered, and this was the only generation available to Japanese buyers. The engine displacement contributed to a lower annual road tax obligation to Japanese buyers which helped sales.

South Africa

Approximately 100 Mk 1 Escort RS1600s were sent to South Africa as knock down kits (CKD) in 1970/1 and were assembled in the Ford Port Elizabeth plant. They were sold through the Ford dealer network but some of the initial cars suffered oil feed problems which was later rectified by Ford in collaboration with Cosworth.

A batch of sixty RS1600s were sold by Ford SA to Basil Green Motors in Edenvale, Johannesburg who replaced the twin cam BDA engines with the 2000cc SOHC Pinto engine and the car was renamed the Escort Perana.

Approximately 40 of the original cars retained the twin-cam BDA engine and these cars were sold as RS1600s by Ford dealers throughout South Africa. These cars had an identification tag under the driver’s seat in addition to the Ford SA VIN tag in the engine compartment.

South African RS1600s had various detailed differences from the Ford UK cars. They were painted yellow with a black stripe to the rear panel and to the cills. They also had black blocks painted on the bonnet. The front seats were from the Capri V4.

Second generation (1974–1980)

The squarer-styled Mark II version appeared in January 1975. The first production models had rolled off the production lines on 2 December 1974.

Unlike the first Escort (which was developed by Ford of Britain), the second generation was developed jointly between the UK and Ford of Germany. Codenamed "Brenda" during its development, it used the same mechanical components, floorpan and core structure as the Mark I. The 940 cc engine was still offered in Italy where the smaller engine attracted tax advantages, but in the other larger European markets in Europe it was unavailable. The estate and van versions used the same doors, roof and rear panelwork as the Mark I, but with the Mark II front end and interior.

The car used a revised underbody, which had been introduced as a running change during the last six months production of the Mark I. The rear suspension still sat on leaf springs though some contemporaries such as the Hillman Avenger had moved on to coil springs. The car came in for criticism for its lack of oddments space, with a glove compartment available on only higher end models, and its stalk-mounted horn.

The "L" and "GL" models (2-door, 4-door, estate) were in the mainstream private sector, the "Sport", "RS Mexico", and "RS2000" in the performance market, the "Ghia" (2-door, 4-door) for a hitherto untapped small car luxury market, and "base / Popular" models for the bottom end. The base spec Popular versions for British market were divided into "Popular" and "Popular Plus", with the former being an "austerity" model with vinyl seats and rubber carpets, the 'Plus' version having a fully trimmed interior. 

Panel-van versions catered to the commercial sector. The 1.6 L (1598 cc/97 CID) engine in the 1975 1.6 Ghia produced 84 hp (63 kW) with 125 N·m (92 ft·lbf) torque and weighed 955 kg (2105 lb).

In August 1977, the Escort received its first noticeable facelift, with the front grille, trunk lid and steering wheel hub cap being fitted with the oval Ford logo instead of the previous single-letter lettering.

A further cosmetic update was given in 1978 (note that Australia received differing updates - see below), with L models gaining the square headlights (previously exclusive to the GL and Ghia variants) and there was an upgrade in interior and exterior specification for some models. All models (other than RS) had a new steering wheel and the horizontal chrome strip along the center of the grille removed. Underneath a wider front track was given. 

In 1979 and 1980 three special edition Escorts were launched: the Linnet, Harrier and Goldcrest.

Production ended in Britain in August 1980, other countries following soon after.

Europe

Oceania

Australia
The Mk II Escort was assembled at Ford Australia's Homebush Plant, Sydney from March 1975 to 1980 in 2-door and 4-door sedan, and 2-door panel van forms – the estate versions were unavailable to the Australian market.

The sedan models were available in L, XL (later renamed GL) and Ghia forms, and a Sport pack option – similar to the 1300 and 1600 Sport models sold elsewhere. Unlike other markets – likely due to the estate's absence – the van was offered in a higher level of trim – a GL, and a Sport pack van was also available. Unusual fitments for the range not offered elsewhere on the Australian Escort included 'dog-dish' steel hubcaps, and high-backed front seats.

The initial powerplants utilized in the Australian Escorts were Ford's 1.3 L and 1.6 L OHV Crossflow units, offered with either 4-speed manual or 3-speed automatic transmissions. In 1977, to cope with Australian emission laws, in particular ADR27A, the 1.3L models were dropped and the Ford Cortina's 2.0L OHC Pinto engine (in a lower tune to European units) was introduced to the Escort range, available as an option on nearly all models. Codenamed internally by Ford Australia as "BC", the Australian Escort range's bodies were modified to fit the larger engine and a redesigned fuel-tank, which involved the placement of the fuel filler being behind the rear numberplate.

In 1978, Ford Australia standardised the use of the blue oval logo across the Escort model range. These Escort models are identified by the familiar blue Ford oval in the centre of the grille and on the right of the bootlid. It also revamped the image of its 'leisure range' by introducing the Escort Sundowner panel van, positioning it as a youth-orientated lifestyle vehicle complete with bold body decorations and domed side windows, available in 1.6L and 2.0L forms. In 1979, Ford Australia gave the Escort an update, increasing basic equipment levels and standardising square headlights on L and GL models (previously only available on Escort Ghia). Chasing both youth and performance, Ford Australia introduced their take on the RS2000, which – complete with its slant-nose – was available in both two-door form and as a unique to Australia four-door, in a choice of five solid paint colours. These RS cars certainly looked the part, but were actually powered by the same 2.0-litre engine as the rest of the local Escort range, and available with a choice of manual or automatic transmission. A total of 2,400 Australian RS2000 cars were made.

While offered in many model forms, the Escort, like the Cortina, was not popular on the Australian market, largely due to expanding competition from Japanese imports and the established preference of Australian drivers for larger six-cylinder vehicles, including Ford Australia's own Falcon.

Australian Escort production ceased in late 1980, with 79,142 examples of the Mk II produced, the range being replaced by FWD derivatives of the Mazda 323/Familia, namely the Ford Laser 3-door and 5-door hatchback and the Meteor 4-door sedan.

New Zealand
The Mk II Escort was introduced to New Zealand in early 1975, assembled at Ford's plant in Wiri, South Auckland. Unlike the Australian models, the New Zealand Escort range followed the specifications of the British models, aside from the use of metric instrumentation. All bodystyles were assembled, including the estate – previously (in Mk I guise) a built-up import from the United Kingdom.

A large choice of models were available in the NZ Escort range, consisting of 1.1 L (base), 1.3 L (L, GL, 1300 Sport, estate and van variants) and 1.6 L (Ghia, 1600 Sport) variants — the 1.1 being aimed at budget conscious buyers, the 1.3 L models were popular, and the 1.6 L – which appeared in New Zealand production in 1976 – being reserved for 1600 Sport and Ghia models. A three-speed automatic transmission was available as an option for most 1.3- and 1.6-litre models.

Unlike Australia, the Escort and Cortina ranges sold well and often topped the car monthly sales lists. An update was given for the range for 1979, which notably involved the addition of the Ghia model, the adoption of the GL's square headlights on the lower end models, Ford blue oval badging, and sport wheels on the L and GL. For 1980, all Ghia models gained standard alloy wheels.

The production of British-sourced and New Zealand-assembled Escorts ended in late 1980. Ford dealers offered large price reductions to shift their remaining Mk II Escort stock when the model was replaced in New Zealand by the Ford Laser in May 1981, which was a badge engineered Mazda 323, available in sedan and hatchback forms.

Rest of the world
Israel
Assembly of the Mk II Escort commenced in August 1975. The Escort was a best-seller in the Israeli market, its best year being 1976, when a total of 3,801 units were assembled. The line-up included 1.1- and 1.3-litre versions. Most were of the four-door variety, and only 150 were built as a 2-door 1.1L. Assembly ended after 12,700 units, in April 1981. No Ford passenger car was since then assembled in Israel.

South Africa
Escort Mark II shells built in Halewood, England were assembled in Struandale, Port Elizabeth, South Africa from late 1975 until 1980. When originally launched, the Escort Mark II was sold as the 1300 L or as the 1600 GL, with two- or four-door bodywork. Aside from colour-coded hubcaps, most of the equipment differences were only on the inside with the GL being considerably better equipped. The GL also received square headlights, back-up lights, and body-side mouldings. Early in 1979 the 1600 sport was launched, featuring a two-door bodyshell, revised gear ratios and a sporty look, using the 1600 motor proving to become a highly popular vehicle to the present day. The "One Six Double O" Sport was the best selling car in South Africa in 1980 at its retail price of R4995.00. These vehicles had a stronger Kent block cast in South Africa that had thicker cylinder walls, which was and is still utilised in the Formula Ford series. SA vehicles differed in minor ways from European built counterparts in that the interior exposed metal parts were painted Matt black as opposed to body colour and the bonnet/hood prop pivoted from the right as opposed to the left.

Nevertheless, South Africa is now a popular source for re-importing Mk II's back to the UK, since many have survived in the hotter climate (and are therefore not as vulnerable to rust), compared with the number of good condition European and British built examples rapidly dwindling.  Like the Mk I, many road cars were converted for rally use which further degraded the number of usable examples for classic enthusiasts.

Rallying

As with its predecessor, the Mark II had a successful rallying career. All models of the Mark I were carried over to the Mark II, though the Mexico gained the RS badge and had its engine changed to a  OHC Pinto instead of the OHV. A "Sport" model was also produced using the 1.6 L Crossflow. It was essentially a special created for rallying.

The works rally cars were highly specialised machines. Bodyshells were heavily strengthened and characterised by the wide wheelarch extensions, and fitment of four large spotlights for night stages. It was complemented by a strengthened transmission, five-speed straight-cut ZF gearbox, five-linked suspension and more minor modifications. The RS1800 was re-homologated with the aluminium block on 2 April 1977 as the 1975 cc Group-4 Escort RS. This was after the FIA removed the 100-off rule from Appendix J 1976 and banned modifications approved under the previous rules for groups 2 and 4, effective from the end of 1977.

The Mark II Escort continued its predecessor's run on the RAC Rally, winning every year from 1975 to 1979 and racing in a variety of other events around the world. In the 1979 season of the World Rally Championship, Björn Waldegård took the drivers' title, Hannu Mikkola was runner-up and Ari Vatanen finished the year in fifth place, all driving Escort RS1800s.

These drivers' successes throughout the year gave Ford the manufacturers' title, the only time the company had achieved this until the 2006 season, when Marcus Grönholm and Mikko Hirvonen won the title for Ford in Ford Focus RS WRC 06. Vatanen won the drivers' title in 1981, again at the wheel of an RS1800. This victory came despite the arrival on the WRC scene of the four-wheel drive Audi Quattro. Ford placed in the top three in the manufacturers' championship for the sixth year in a row.

The 2.0 L RS2000 version, with its distinctively slanted polyurethane nose, and featuring the Pinto engine from the Cortina, was announced in the UK in March 1975 and introduced in Germany in August 1975, being reportedly produced in both countries. It provided a claimed 110 bhp and a top speed of 110 mph (177 km/h). For acceleration to 100 km/h (62.5 mph) a time of 8.9 seconds was claimed by the manufacturers. The 2.0 L engine was also easily retro-fitted into the Mark I, along with the Ford Sierra's five-speed gearbox, for rallying and other sports.

World Rally Championship - round victories

Third generation (1980–1986)

Codenamed "Erika", the third generation Escort was launched in September 1980. and was Ford of Europe's second front wheel drive model.  The North American Escort introduced at this time was a distantly related derivative. Sales in the United Kingdom increased, and by 1982 it had overtaken the ageing Cortina as the nation's best-selling car, beginning an eight-year run as Britain's best selling car.

Unlike the Mark II, which had essentially been a reskin of the original 1968 platform, the Mark III was a completely new design, and was conceived as a hi-tech, high-efficiency vehicle which would compete with the Volkswagen Golf and Honda Civic – considered at the time the class benchmarks.   The Mark III was therefore a major engineering and stylistic departure from the two previous models; the biggest changes being the adoption of front-wheel drive, the new hatchback body and the all-new CVH overhead camshaft engines. The suspension was fully independent all around, departing from the archaic leaf spring arrangement found on its predecessors and the bodyshell was on average, 75 kg lighter than that of the Mk II, yet Ford claimed was stiffer than the outgoing car.  Ford however, was conscious that loyal customers of the previous generation Escorts may be deterred by the Mk III's advanced design, and hence the car was marketed in the United Kingdom with the strapline "Simple is Efficient".  The major changes to the Escort mirrored that of its General Motors contemporary launched just months before - the Opel Kadett D (Vauxhall Astra Mk I) - which had also changed to an advanced front wheel drive hatchback from the rear wheel drive sedan architecture of its predecessor.

It was Ford Europe's second front-wheel drive model launch, the first being the smaller Fiesta in 1976. The car used Ford's contemporary design language of the period with the black louvred radiator grille and straked rear lamp clusters, as well as introducing the aerodynamic "bustle-back" bootlid stump (trademarked by Ford as Aeroback) which would be further developed in the forthcoming Sierra and Scorpio; the stump was proven to reduce the car's aerodynamic drag co-efficient significantly, which was a class-leading 0.38 at launch.

New were the overhead camshaft CVH engines in 1.3 L and 1.6 L formats, with the older Ford Kent-based "Valencia" engine from the Fiesta powering the 1.1 L derivative, although there was a short-lived 1.1 version of the CVH engine sold in certain markets before it was discontinued in 1982.

The Escort Mark III was voted European Car of the Year in 1981, fighting off stiff competition from Italy's Fiat Panda and British Leyland's Austin Metro.

From launch, the car was available in base (Popular), L, GL, Ghia and XR3 trim. As was common for Ford during this period, there were different dashboard mouldings for "high" and "low" series trim levels. GL and above models had a slush-moulded dashboard with 'soft feel' covering, and faux chrome embellishment.  Base and L specification models had a 'hard feel' injection moulded dashboard with fewer holes for switches - the base dashboard was a sub-variation of this which omitted the centre air vents, glovebox, side demister vents and speaker grille and only a two-position blower fan switch.  These lead-in models were extremely basic even for their time; in addition to the aforementioned dashboard, they came with just partial door cards with no armrests, vinyl seats (cloth was an optional extra), and no rear parcel tray or push button tailgate release.  Consequently, these models sold very poorly and most buyers opted for at least the L specification.

From mid-1982, a five-speed manual gearbox was introduced across the range. This was now standard on the 1.6 L versions and could be specified as an option on most 1.3 L engines. A selection of features was available, either as standard fitment or optional extras depending on model, including a tilt-and-slide sunroof, central locking, and electric windows. All models except for base and L were fitted with a check-light system for low fuel, low oil, low coolant, low screenwash, and worn out brake pads. Power steering was not available on European Escorts although it was available on the US Escort. The 1983 model year saw the  Ford ATX three-speed automatic transmission (developed primarily for the US version) becoming  available on the 1.6 L engine, and the base models now had cloth seat trim as standard.

The Escort estate was initially only available with three doors, but a five-door version was introduced in 1983. In that year, a saloon version of the Escort, the Orion, was launched. It used the same mechanicals as the hatchback, but had a more upmarket image and was not available with the smaller 1.1 L engine. It was also directed at buyers of the earlier Cortina, which had ceased production in 1982, with its Sierra successor not available as a saloon at the time.

However, the car attracted criticism from the motoring press at launch due to its suspension, with positive camber on the front wheels and negative camber at the rear, giving rise to the Mark III's infamous "knock-kneed" stance. The Mark III soon had a reputation for a harsh, unforgiving ride. In September 1983 the revised suspension mounts from the Escort-based Orion and the larger Sierra steering rack were introduced as running changes for the 1984 model year which also coincided with other minor upgrades across the range, which included revised trim and steering wheels, new style badging and improved sound systems across the range,   whilst the austere base models were finally given the "L" specification dashboard and improved seat trim.

Another engine, introduced in August 1983, was the  diesel engine. Developed in Dagenham, it was remarkably economical for its time, and still is to this day, managing over 70 mpg. It was available on the L and GL models. However, the performance was worse than the 1.1 L petrol version, with only  and a top speed of barely  - which prompted Ford to eventually enlarge the engine to 1.8 L some years later in the facelifted Escort.

The Mk III Escort (1980–1986), was the most common type of car on British roads in December 1989, with almost 1,500,000 examples registered.

A convertible version, made by coachbuilder Karmann, appeared the same year as the five-door estate (1983). It was the first drop-top car produced by Ford Europe since the Corsair of the 1960s. The Escort Cabriolet was initially available in both XR3i and Ghia specification, but the Ghia variant was later dropped.

Origin of the "Erika" codename

The origins of the codename "Erika" for the Escort Mk III is now subject to dispute - the most likely being Ford of Europe policy in the late 1970s for using female names for new projects such as "Brenda" (Escort Mk II), "Gloria" (Granada MkII), "Carla" (Capri MkIII), "Teresa" (Taunus TC3/Cortina Mk5) and "Toni" (Sierra). It was known that Henry Ford II's secretary's name during his tenure as CEO of Ford Europe was Erika, and it has been suggested in some sources that the name came from here.  Other theories being that the Escort was originally meant to be called the "Ford Erika", but ended up retaining the Escort name. Some say this was due to British consumers' reluctance to let go of the "Escort" badge (as the first two generations of Escort had been among Britain's most popular cars, with the Mk II being Britain's best selling car in 1976), and some say that the Germans were concerned with the song Erika, which was a famous battlemarch of the German armed forces during World War II.

Sporting models

To compete with Volkswagen's Golf GTI, a hot hatch version of the Mark III was developed – the XR3. Initially this featured a tuned version of the 1.6 L CVH engine fitted with a twin-choke Weber carburettor, uprated suspension and numerous cosmetic alterations. It lacked a five-speed transmission and fuel injection. Fuel injection finally arrived in October 1982 (creating the XR3i), eight months behind the limited edition (8,659 examples), racetrack-influenced RS 1600i.

The final performance update arrived in the form of the turbocharged  RS Turbo model in October 1984. The RS Turbo was somewhat of a disappointment; it had been delayed several times and when it went on sale in early 1985, the chassis came in for severe criticism. Ford initially planned to build 5,000 RS Turbos, the minimum number required for homologation in Group A. However a total of 8,604 were built due to increased demand, almost all in Diamond White. Produced in both LHD and RHD, it was only marketed in a few European nations with 5,000 examples for the UK, and was only sold through official Rallye Sport dealers. They were well equipped, with the alloy wheels from the limited production RS 1600i, Recaro seats, and a viscous-coupling limited slip differential. Only three cars were finished in black; one of them built especially for Lady Diana. The Series 2 RS Turbo continued with the 1986 MKIV model.

RS 1700T
Ford were initially keen that the Escort Mk III continued the strong rallying heritage of its two predecessors.  The Ford Escort RS 1700T was a prototype RWD car designed by Ford Motor Company in 1980 to compete in Group B rallying. Prototypes were based on the Mk III Escort and featured a Cosworth developed 1.8-litre turbocharged four-cylinder engine that produced over  maximum power. Also a prototype with a 2.4 litre Hart engine (derived from a Formula Two unit) was tested in 1982.

Persistent problems during the vehicle's development, coupled with unease within the marketing department that a Mk III Escort with rear wheel drive would be perceived as a retrograde step and contradicted the high-technology image  they were trying to promote with the regular production version prompted Ford to drop plans for its production and instead begin work on a bespoke all-wheel-drive model to beat the Audi Quattro, designed and built from scratch, resulting in the RS200.

Commercial models
The two-door Escort Van was first sold in February 1981, a slightly delayed introduction caused by large remaining stocks of the Mark II Escort Van. The Van has twin rear doors and unusual small side windows behind the front doors, necessary to provide more over-the-shoulder visibility which would otherwise be limited by the use of the short front doors from the five-door Escort.  The main engineering change was to the rear suspension - namely the use of a solid beam axle on leaf springs in place of the fully independent set-up found on the hatchback and estate.  At launch, the Mk3 van was available in two versions -  3.5cwt capacity (with the 1.3 engine) and 5.5cwt capacity (with the 1.6 engine).  Both versions were offered in two trim levels - standard and "L", which mirrored the base and L models of the cars.

For the 1984 model year the engines options were revised with the 55cwt version now available with either the 1.3 CVH petrol or 1.6 diesel, whilst the 35cwt version reduced to 1.1 Valencia power.  Equipment levels were improved slightly, with the standard van now gaining the better "L" spec dashboard with an opening glovebox, centre air vents and 3-speed blower fan.

Encouraged by the success of recreational vans in Europe such as the Matra Rancho, Ford toyed with a concept "XRV" version of the van, which used the XR3's uprated engine and a fully trimmed interior, but decided against putting it into production.

Derived from the van was a pickup version of the Escort, the Bantam, which was produced in South Africa.

Latin America
The Escort entered production in Brazil in July 1983, with either three or five doors. To better deal with the tropical heat, the Brazilian three-door Escort received swing-out rear windows, unlike their European counterparts. It was equipped with the Renault-based Ford CHT engine, of either 1341 or 1555 cc. Both size engines were also available in alcohol-fuelled versions with marginally more power. It was originally available in base (Popular), L or GL trim levels, with four- or five-speed manual transmissions. In October 1983 the luxurious Ghia version was added.

This model was exported to Sweden, Finland, Denmark and Norway from 1983 until 1986, as the Escort LX, where it replaced the low priced German-built Escort L. The car had a bad reputation in Scandinavia, with severe rust problems and issues with the wet liners of the Renault-designed engine. The engines were also designed to run on petrol containing some ethanol (10-20%), leading to troubles when using straight petrol. That problem could be avoided by adding ethanol in the petrol manually. The Brazilian Escort LX was also available in Switzerland, only with the larger engine option.

Brazil also received an XR3 version towards the very end of 1983, only available with a tuned version of the 1.6-liter engine running on alcohol. Aside from interior and exterior enhancements including spoilers and 14-inch alloy wheels, the XR3's engine produced , a bit more than the regular versions but not quite enough to be considered a sporting car. In April 1985, the Escort Cabriolet was introduced. It was built in Brazil in collaboration between Ford and Karmann, with the top imported from Germany.

South Africa
The Escort was also available in South Africa, as hatchback only, from March 1981, with the 1.3 and 1.6 litre engines. The South African Escorts differ only slightly from European ones, as a result of local parts content regulations. The XR3 was also sold, known simply as the Ford XR3 and later XR3i, rather than the Ford Escort XR3.

Fourth generation (1986–1992)

The fourth version of the Ford Escort was launched in March 1986, with only a small number of changes. Although popularly regarded as a fourth generation model (and is popularly known as the "Mark IV"), internally within Ford it was regarded as a Mark III facelift and consequently carried the codename 'Erika-86'.

It was instantly recognisable as an updated version of the previous model, taking styling cues from the recently introduced Scorpio/Granada III - with a smooth style nose and the "straked" rear lamp clusters smoothed over. Internally the car had a revised interior, with new door cards, a completely new dashboard, switchgear and instrumentation, although the check-light system for low fuel, low oil, low coolant, low screenwash, and worn out brake pads was dropped.  Optional new features included a mechanical anti‐lock braking system (standard on RS Turbo models), a fuel computer on fuel-injected models, and a heated windscreen.  The main mechanical changes were the introduction of a 'lean-burn' 1.4 L CVH engine (replacing the previous 1.3 CVH) . A 1.3 L version of the Valencia overhead valve engine was introduced for the Popular and L specification models, in addition to the existing 1.1L version.  A new subframe for mounting the powertrain was introduced to combat earlier criticisms of drivetrain refinement of the original car, as well as more tweaking to the suspension settings to address the long standing issues with the Escort's damping and handling characteristics.  Initially Chubb AVA lock barrels were fitted to the facelifted 1986 models but these were soon changed over to the Tibbe type as with the Ford Orion.

These changes were welcome at a time when the Escort was faced with a host of new competitors; General Motors had brought out a new version of the Opel Kadett/Vauxhall Astra 18 months earlier, shortly after Volkswagen had introduced the Mk II Golf and British Leyland had launched the Austin Maestro, while the British-built Peugeot 309 had gone on sale just weeks before the updated Escort. All-new competitors from Fiat and Renault were just two years away.

In 1987, an LX trim designation was introduced, situated between the L and GL models. That same year, the commercial line-up was expanded with a sedan delivery version of the 3-door station wagon bodyshell (with filled in rear windows and no back seats) known as the "Combi", which sat below the existing van versions.

The 1989 model year cars saw major changes to the engine line up, with the diesel engine being enlarged to 1.8 L.  The entry level 1.1 L and 1.3 L models were updated with the redesigned HCS version of the Valencia engine developed for the Mk III Fiesta. On the 1.6 L CVH injection engines, a Ford developed electronic fuel injection system replaced the Bosch K-Jetronic fuel injection system in the XR3i and Orion Ghia injection. Other changes for the '89 were the slightly altered front grille aperture (which was now common to both the Escort and Orion) whilst the Escort badge at the rear changed to look more modern as well as some minor trim revisions and equipment upgrades on all models - "L" models now had tinted glass and a sunroof as standard.

Ford gave the Escort‐based Orion saloon a similar makeover. Carried over from the previous range was the 3-speed automatic which was ultimately replaced late in the production run with a variant of the CTX stepless gearbox as first used in the Fiesta a couple of years earlier.

The 1990 model year saw equipment levels across the range improved substantially, with all but the base Popular models being fitted with a sunroof as standard, and the GL gaining electric windows and mirrors.  Spring 1990 saw the final revisions - the Popular now gained a radio cassette and a 5-speed gearbox, whilst catalytic converters and central point fuel injection were now available on the 1.4 and 1.6 CVH engines.

Special Editions

As part of the run-out year of the Erika-platform Escort and Orion after a decade of production, several notable special edition models were created - a luxurious Orion 1600E with leather seats, fuel injection, alloy wheels and most optional extras as standard was produced during 1989 and 1990. A total of 1,600 were made. The "Bonus" was essentially a 3-door 1.3 Popular, but with metallic paint and tailgate wash/wipe as standard.  The Escort Eclipse (based on the 1.3 LX) fitted with electric windows, alloy wheels, boot spoiler and only available in two colours - Amalfi Blue or Flambeau Red (shades that were previously reserved for the XR3i) - was sold up until the model's discontinuation in September 1990.

Despite the appearance of the new generation Escort, dealer stocks of the Mk4 remained available well into the following year - in the United Kingdom a small number were registered with "J" prefix licence plates indicating a post-August 1991 registration date - one year after the end of production, possibly due to overstock or the negative reception of its successor.

Manufacturing locations

Escorts for European markets continued to be assembled at Halewood, near Liverpool, and at the West German factory of Saarlouis. Sales were strong through the decade, and during the later 1980s Escort production also commenced at the Ford plant originally established for Fiesta production in Valencia. European production finished in 1990, although stocks of the model, especially the XR3i and RS Turbo variants continued well into 1991 and eventually finished in 1992.

At this time, the Escort was dropped in South Africa and replaced by the Mazda-derived Laser and Meteor. However, the Escort‐based Bantam pick-up remained in production, facelifted, and was also sold as a Mazda Rustler.

Latin America
Brazilian Escorts were introduced only shortly after the European originals, in August 1987. At first, only the CHT 1.6-liter engine was available, running on alcohol or petrol and in a more powerful XR3 version only running on alcohol. Power was up marginally over the previous generation. As of May 1989, the 1.8 L and 1.6 L AP engine made by Volkswagen became available. This was part of the AutoLatina agreement, where Ford CHT engines were used in Volkswagen cars and vice versa. The 1.0 L and 1.6 L were all Ford CHT motors. All Escorts made after 1993 were fuel-injected, excepting the Hobby models. Additionally, the Mark IV model was made until 1992 on all versions, except the Hobby which was made until 1996.

This generation was only built with three doors in Brazil, while Argentinian production included the five-door model. The advent of Mercosur opened the door for trade with Brazil's neighbours. In late 1991, for the 1992 model year, the Argentinian-made five-door became available in Brazil under the name "Escort Guarujá" (named after a town in the state of São Paulo). This model was only available with a catalyzed version of the 1.8-liter "AP" engine and a high standard of equipment, including the Ghia's body-coloured rear spoiler and distinct, eight-hole alloy wheels. The Guarujá was the first catalyzed car to be built in Argentina, although it was not available in its home market. It sold well initially, leading all other imports in January 1992. However, Argentinian products had a low reputation in Brazil at the time and the Guarujá only remained on the market for about a year. In 1990, the XR3 gained body-colored skirts and wings.

Argentinian production had begun in 1988 with many parts imported from Brazil, although the five-door model was available there from the beginning and the engine options differed. The original versions were the GL and Ghia, both fitted with the 1.6-liter CHT; these were then replaced by the Volkswagen-made AP 1.6 (not used in Brazilian Escorts) in the Escort 1.6 LX and Ghia SX after a little over a year. There was also the 1.8-liter Ghia S - close in spec to the Guarujá export version, and with available air conditioning - and the sporty XR3. The convertible was available, shipped in fully built from Brazil. The fourth generation Escort remained in production in Argentina until 1994.

In 1993, the Escort Hobby trim was introduced in Brazil, using a 1.0 L  engine. This was a small-bore version derived from the CHT 1.3 L used in the Brazilian Mk III. This engine was unique to Brazil, whereas the 1.1 L engine was smallest available in most markets. The 1.0 was less powerful, but fuel efficient. Brazil has a special tax break for cars with engines of less than one litre, making this a closely contested segment. The Hobby did not receive Escort badging.

There were no trims with a high-power engine in Brazil. The most powerful Escort was the 1991 Escort XR3 Formula which had . The on-board computer was not available in Brazil.

Fifth generation (1990–1997)

The Escort Mark V (and Mark III Orion saloon) arrived in September 1990 with an all-new bodyshell and a simplified torsion beam rear suspension (instead of the Mark III's fully independent layout). Initially the 1.3 L HCS, 1.4 L and 1.6 L CVH petrol and 1.8 L diesel units were carried over from the old model.  This model however was poorly received by the motoring press, and was panned by journalists for its mediocre driving dynamics and unremarkable styling.  The engines which had been carried over from the previous generation largely unmodified were also heavily criticised for their poor refinement.

In early 1992, an all new Zetec 16-valve engine was launched bringing improved driveability, while also marking the return of the XR3i which was available with two versions of the 1.8 L Zetec engine. The 150 PS (110 kW) RS2000 also appeared in the autumn of 1991 with a 16v version of the Sierra's I4 2.0 L engine and also improved ride and handling meaning that this version of the Escort finally delivered on the road. Specifications, however, were also higher than before. The Escort was now available with items such as power steering, electric windows, central locking, electronic antilock brakes, and air conditioning. Some of these options were even available on some of the entry-level models.

South America
The fifth generation Escort was launched in South America in December 1992, being manufactured in Brazil and Argentina by AutoLatina, a joint-venture between Volkswagen and Ford. A result of this collaboration was that these Escorts were equipped with a VW AP engine in the top 1.8 and 2.0 L versions, now fitted with catalytic converters. The top of the line was the Escort XR3i, equipped with a multipoint fuel injected version of the VW AP 2.0 L engine generating 115 PS (85 kW).

Three- and five-door hatchbacks were available, as was a two-door convertible. In October 1993 the Verona appeared as the 4-door saloon and was also available in Argentina. This generation also spawned two VW-branded cars with the same mechanics (but different body styles and interiors) called Volkswagen Pointer (five-door hatchback) and Logus (a two-door saloon).

For 1996, South America received the front end of the European facelift ("sixth generation"), but the rear end maintained the original scheme which makes this vehicle unique to those markets. The XR3 nameplate was dropped, becoming the Escort Racer. Just before being redesigned to match the European Mark VI, Brazilian production came to a halt and Argentina became the sole Escort manufacturer in South America. The cars were exported to Brazil and elsewhere.

Escort RS Cosworth

Early 1992 saw the launch of the Escort RS Cosworth. Intended to replace the Sierra Sapphire RS Cosworth (which finished production shortly afterwards) as Ford's stalwart rally challenger as well as a competitor to supercars with private buyers, it used the turbocharged 2.0 L Cosworth 16-valve engine, generated some 227 PS (167 kW) and was capable of 150 mph. As well as having four-wheel drive, its most memorable feature was its extremely large "whale-tail" tailgate spoiler.

The 2,500 road-going examples sold (required for homologation purposes) were made, but demand for the car was so high that Ford kept producing them. Later models (1995 up) have a smaller turbo than the homologation versions and came with the whale-tail spoiler as an option. The Escort Cosworth ceased production in 1996, but it has already achieved classic status and has a huge following. However, the car wasn't mechanically an Escort, being based on the four-wheel drive Sierra floorpan and mechanicals, including its longitudinally mounted engine, and was merely clothed in body panels to resemble a Mark V.

Engines
 1.3 L (1297 cc) HCS 
 1.4 L CFi (1392 cc) CVH 
 1.4 L EFi (1392 cc) CVH 
 1.6 L G/H (1597 cc) CVH 
 1.6 L EFi (1597 cc) CVH 
 1.6 L EFi (1598 cc) Zetec 
 1.8 L EFi (1796 cc) Zetec 
 1.8 L EFi (1796 cc) Zetec 
 1.8 L EFi (1796 cc) Zetec 
 1.8 L D (1753 cc) Endura D 
 1.8 L TD (1753 cc) Endura D 
 1.8 L TD (1753 cc) Endura D 
 1.8 L TD (1753 cc) Endura D 
 2.0 L EFi (1998 cc) I4 DOHC 
 2.0 L (1993 cc) Cosworth YBT 
 1.8 L (1781 cc) VW AP 
 2.0 L (1984 cc) VW AP

Facelift

Stung by the criticism of the original Mark V (which was still hugely popular despite motoring press criticism of its styling, ride and handling), Ford facelifted the Escort and Orion in September 1992, giving the revised cars a new grille, bonnet and, in the Escort convertible and hatchback's case, a new rear end. A new 1.6 L 16-valve 90 bhp (66 kW) Zetec engine was introduced, replacing the previous CVH. Fuel injection was now standard on all petrol models, and Ford introduced a four-wheel-drive variant of the RS2000, offering much improved handling over its front-wheel-drive cousins. A first for the Escort also saw the introduction of all disc brakes on all four wheels as standard on all RS2000 and XR3i models.

Also new for 1993 were 1.3 L and 1.4 L CFi petrol engines and 1.8 L diesel engines.

In September 1993 after a decade, the Orion name was retired, with the saloon taking on the Escort badge. The XR3i was discontinued several months later, at the beginning of 1994.

The crash structure of the Escort and Orion was also improved for the 1993 model year as part of the facelift, featuring side impact bars, a reinforced safety cage, improved crumple zones and front seat-belt pretensioners and for the 1994 model year airbags were added to the Escort range when the Orion name was dropped. This Escort was the first European Ford after the Mondeo to feature an airbag; shortly afterwards a driver's airbag became standard across the whole Ford range, with many other models having a passenger airbag as at least optional equipment. Production ended in 1995, although stocks including the Escort, Escort L, Ghia and Si continued through 1996 and finished in 1997.

Sixth generation (1995–2002)

The Ford Escort was revised in January 1995, although it was still based on the previous model. This version had new front lights, bonnet, front wings, front and rear bumpers, wing mirrors, door handles and 4 different front radiator grilles (slats, honeycomb, circles and chrome). At the rear, the Ford logo moved from the right to the centre of the boot, except for the van and some convertible models. The interior of the car was hugely revised too following heavy criticism of the original 1990 car which featured low quality plastics for its interior mouldings - the car now featured an all new dashboard arrangement of competitive quality. However, the underlying car was now five years old and most of its rivals were either new or to be imminently replaced.

The two entry level engines were revised – the 1.3 L received the latest (and final) version of Valencia pushrod engine - the Endura-E from the recently launched Mk IV Fiesta and Ka, whilst the 1.4L CVH was replaced by the updated CVH-PTE unit. There were no changes to either the venerable 1.8 diesel or the 1.6/1.8 Zetec units at the top end of the range. The improved iB5 version of the venerable BC-series transmission was also later introduced as a running change.

Dynamically, the handling and ride were also much improved with revised suspension set up from that on the previous Mark V models. The sporty "Si" model had slightly stiffer suspension than the Encore, LX and Ghia variants, although the Si was otherwise the same as the LX with some additional standard, mainly cosmetic, enhancements such as front and rear spoilers (which were also available as options on the LX), sports seats and white-faced dashboard instruments. Some special trim levels of the Escort include: Calypso Cabriolet, Freedom, Serenade, Cabaret and Mexico.

The RS2000 models ceased production in June 1996, and were the last Escorts ever to wear the famous RS badge. The RS badge did not resurface until the Focus RS arrived in 2002. A new Ghia X model was introduced around 1996, which included air conditioning and a 6 CD autochanger as standard. Although the equipment of the Ghia below it was reduced, it was now more affordable.

The last "standard" model to be introduced in 1997 was the GTi — the only GTi-badged Ford to ever be sold in Europe. This used the same existing 115 PS (85 kW) 1.8 L Zetec-E engine found in other cars in the range, but included a body kit borrowed from the now cancelled RS2000 model, part-leather seats plus the standard fitment of ABS. The GTi was available in 3- and 5-door hatchback and estate bodystyles.

In Chile, to avoid confusion with the US-market Escort which was being sold alongside it, this generation was sold as the "EuroEscort" for several years.

Escort Classic

In 1998, Ford announced an all-new car, the Focus, which replaced the Escort and superseded the "Escort" name that had been in use for 30 years. The Escort range was cut down to just "Flight" and "Finesse" editions, and sold for a further two years in parallel with the Focus. All engines except the 1.6 L petrol and 1.8 L turbo diesel were dropped, as were the three-door hatchback, four-door saloon and cabriolet bodystyles (except in mainland Europe, New Zealand, South Africa and South America).

The Flight cost £10,380 and offered electric front windows, a three-speed fan and a cassette player. For an additional £1,000 the Finesse added alloy wheels, air conditioning, a CD player, fog lamps and metallic paint. The more competitive prices managed to keep European Escort sales going until the last one rolled off the Halewood assembly line in July 2000, although remaining stocks were sold into 2001, making it the last Ford car to be assembled there. The plant was transferred to Jaguar that year for the new X-Type saloon, and following the later merger with Land Rover and the sale of the plant to Tata, Ford now only has a small presence at Halewood - retaining the transmission works at the site.

Van
The van variant remained in production in a facility located behind the now Jaguar plant at Halewood until 2002 when the new Transit Connect model was introduced. The Escort hatchback and estate were produced in Argentina until 2004, having been sold alongside its successor (the Focus) during the final stages of production. Escort-based light vans had been offered since 1968, although the market sector, always larger in the UK than in continental Europe, dated back beyond the 1950s when successive Ford Anglias had been available with a van variant. After the demise of the Escort, Ford would be represented in this niche by the Turkish assembled Ford Transit Connect.

New Zealand
While this generation was not sold in Australia at any point, it was however sold in New Zealand imported fully built up from the UK between 1996 and 1998 in all bodystyles including the van, replacing the Ford Laser. The hatch and saloon were discontinued in 1999 due to unfavourable exchange rates - this is also the reason why the Laser was reintroduced, and the Focus was not introduced to the New Zealand market until 2003. The Escort estate and van continued on sale on the local market until 1999 until stock from the UK dried up, the estate having reasonable success due to the lack of a replacement Laser wagon following the end of local production of the outdated 1980s KE Laser wagon in 1996. 1.6 or 1.8-litre petrol and the diesel 1.8 were available.

Engines

See also
 Ford Escort RS Cosworth
 Ford Verona

References

Bibliography
 
 ford Britain .co.uk

External links

 

Escort
Euro NCAP small family cars
Station wagons
Front-wheel-drive vehicles
Rear-wheel-drive vehicles
Convertibles
Hot hatches
Sedans
Rally cars
Touring cars
Cars introduced in 1967
1970s cars
1980s cars
1990s cars
2000s cars
Cars of Turkey
Group 4 (racing) cars
Vehicles with CVT transmission